Jake Bilardi (1 December 1996 – 11 March 2015), also known as Abu Abdullah al-Khanzir, dubbed by the media as Halal Jake, was an eighteen-year-old Australian suicide bomber. Bilardi's background has been described as radically different from other Western recruits and symbolises youth issues more than ideological ones.

Life, radicalisation and death
Born in Craigieburn, Victoria, Bilardi was a shy, lonely boy and student who was reportedly bullied by peers. Bilardi kept a blog describing his disdain for United States forces committing crimes against Muslims in the Middle East. He became radical after his mother died of cancer. By 2014, he expressed sympathy for Osama bin Laden on Facebook. Concerned that the Australian government was monitoring him, Bilardi turned to building explosives in the event he would not be able to leave the country. A recruiter for Jabhat al-Nusra made contact with him in August 2014 and he left for Iraq.

Bilardi died in a suicide attack in Ramadi, Iraq on 11 March 2015. The Iraqi Army stated Bilardi's attack was unsuccessful, killing only himself. ISIL used his death as propaganda, in order to recruit more people to become suicide bombers. According to a friend, Bilardi was concerned his family would "spend eternity in hell" for being non-believers.

Reaction
Prime Minister Tony Abbott, commented on Bilardi's death as an "absolutely horrific situation", stating, "it's very, very important that we do everything we can to try to safeguard our young people against the lure of this shocking, alien and extreme ideology." Greg Barton, director of the Centre for Islam and the Modern World considers Bilardi a self-radical motivated by underlying mental health issues instead of religious zealotry.

See also 
 2015 Parramatta shooting
 Jihobbyist
 Terrorism in Australia

References

1996 births
2015 suicides
21st-century Australian criminals
Australian Islamists
Australian Sunni Muslims
Converts to Sunni Islam
Criminals from Melbourne
Islamic State of Iraq and the Levant members from Australia
Suicide bombers
People from Craigieburn, Victoria
Suicide bombings in 2015